Scott Patrick Ruffcorn (born December 29, 1969) is an American former professional baseball pitcher. He played in Major League Baseball for the Chicago White Sox and Philadelphia Phillies between 1993 and 1997.

Amateur career
Ruffcorn attended Stephen F. Austin High School in Austin, Texas and Baylor University, where he compiled a 20–7 record in three seasons. In 1989, he played collegiate summer baseball in the Cape Cod Baseball League for the Yarmouth-Dennis Red Sox.

Professional career
Ruffcorn was the first-round pick of the Chicago White Sox in the 1991 Major League Baseball draft, and the 25th player picked overall. He played with the White Sox at the major league level from 1993 to 1996. In 1997 he played for the Philadelphia Phillies. He never recorded a win at the major league level, ending his career with an 0–8 mark.

Coaching career
After his playing career, he served as the head coach at Hyde Park High School in Austin, Texas.

References

Sources

1969 births
Living people
Chicago White Sox players
Philadelphia Phillies players
Major League Baseball pitchers
Baseball players from Texas
Baylor Bears baseball players
People from New Braunfels, Texas
Sportspeople from New Braunfels, Texas
Gulf Coast White Sox players
South Bend White Sox players
Sarasota White Sox players
Birmingham Barons players
Nashville Sounds players
Scranton/Wilkes-Barre Red Barons players
Indianapolis Indians players
Chattanooga Lookouts players
Omaha Golden Spikes players
St. Paul Saints players
Yarmouth–Dennis Red Sox players